Copelatus vigintistriatus is a species of diving beetle. It is part of the subfamily Copelatinae in the family Dytiscidae. It was described by Fairmaire in 1869.

References

vigintistriatus
Beetles described in 1869